Peltric set is a term referring to the combination of a Pelton wheel and an electric generator, and is a useful water-powered turbine for mountainous regions where the head available is generally high but the flow is low. This set can be economically connected in an existing break pressure tank of a drinking water supply line.

Electrical generators
Water turbines